Fort Atkinson Municipal Airport,  is a city owned public use airport 3 miles (5 km) northeast of the central business district of Fort Atkinson, a city in Jefferson County, Wisconsin, United States. It is included in the Federal Aviation Administration (FAA) National Plan of Integrated Airport Systems for 2021–2025, in which it is categorized as a local general aviation facility.

This airport is assigned location identifier 61C by the FAA but has no designation from the International Air Transport Association (IATA).

Facilities and aircraft 
Fort Atkinson Municipal Airport covers an area of 118 acres (48 ha) at an elevation of 800 feet (244 m) above mean sea level. It has one runway: 3/21 is 3,800 by 60 feet (1,158 x 18 m) with an asphalt surface and has approved GPS approaches.

For the 12-month period ending May 4, 2021, the airport had 10,900 aircraft operations, an average of 30 per day: 98% general aviation, 2% air taxi and less than 1% military.
In January 2023, there were 24 aircraft based at this airport: 18 single-engine, 1 multi-engine, 4 helicopter and 1 ultra-light.

See also
List of airports in Wisconsin

References

External links 
 

 AirportGuide airport information for 61C

Airports in Wisconsin
Buildings and structures in Jefferson County, Wisconsin